Major-General Léonard Mulamba (1928 – 12 August 1986), subsequently Zairianised as Mulamba Nyunyi wa Kadima, was a military and political leader of the Democratic Republic of the Congo.

Biography
Then-Colonel Mulamba was Chief of Staff of the Armée Nationale Congolaise (ANC) from October 1964, until named Prime Minister after the coup d'état led by Joseph-Désiré Mobutu of 25 November 1965. Born in the Kasaï region in 1930, Mulamba joined the colonial gendarmerie known as the Force Publique in 1949. He was promoted to the rank of Sergeant Major by 1960 and after independence quickly became an officer. He commanded IX battalion of gendarmes at Luluabourg in 1960.

In 1962, he was assigned to command the 3rd Groupement at Stanleyville. He "gained international fame for.. defence of Bukavu and for conducting one of the most decisive battles of the 1964 north-east revolution the Simba rebellion of 1964. When Kisangani was recaptured from rebel forces in 1964 he was named military governor of the entire northeastern region." Mulamba has always enjoyed popularity with the troops under his command.

Mulamba was removed from premiership by Mobutu on 26 October 1966, following pressure from army high command. The Historical Dictionary of the DRC writes that "Mobutu dismissed Mulumba and abolished the post on 26 October 1966 by citing Mulumba's lax attitude to the mutiny of the Baka Regiment in Stanleyville" (the first of the Stanleyville mutinies). Following his dismissal, Mobutu became head of government as well as head of state.

He later served as ambassador to India (1967–1969), Japan (1969–1976) and Brazil (1976–1979).

References

1928 births
1986 deaths
Soldiers of the Force Publique
People of the Congo Crisis
Democratic Republic of the Congo military personnel
Prime Ministers of the Democratic Republic of the Congo
Ambassadors of the Democratic Republic of the Congo to India
Ambassadors of the Democratic Republic of the Congo to Japan
Ambassadors of the Democratic Republic of the Congo to Brazil